Military ranks are used by the Palestinian National Security Forces. Due to historical connections, the design of the insignia are similar to Britain and other republican Arab countries like Syria, Egypt, and Iraq. The Palestine Liberation Army, a pro-Syrian Arab Republic Palestinian armed force, also has military ranks and is nearly identical to those used by the PNSF.

Ranks
Commissioned Officers

Enlisted

See also
Palestinian National Security Forces

References

Palestine
Military of the State of Palestine
Palestine